Ahwar a town in south-central Yemen. It is the capital of the Lower Aulaqi. Wadi Ahwar flows into the sea near here.

Populated places in Abyan Governorate
Villages in Yemen
Populated coastal places in Yemen